The Iowa Division of Criminal Investigation (colloquially known as DCI) is the state bureau of investigation for the U.S. state of Iowa. DCI provides investigative support and expertise to law enforcement and public safety agencies operating within Iowa and collaborates with local, state, and federal authorities in the investigation of a variety of criminal activities.

History

The DCI was originally founded as the Bureau of Criminal Investigation (BCI) in 1921 under the direction of state attorney general Ben Gibson. The BCI consolidated all state law enforcement officers who were appointed by the Governor and the Attorney General into one centralized agency.

Organization
The DCI is a component of the Iowa Department of Public Safety.

Bureaus
The main components and associated sub-components of the Division are:

Offices
For purposes of field operations, DCI separates the state into four geographic zones, each of which has a staff of special agents and professional support personnel led by a special agent-in-charge. These offices are often co-located with local offices of the Iowa State Patrol.

The Special Enforcement Operations Bureau has special agent offices within each of the registered and licensed casinos in the state.

Notable Cases
The DCI has been involved in a number of historically notable investigations, including the following:
Investigation of the Hot Lotto fraud scandal
Cadaver identification after the crash of United Airlines Flight 232
Apprehension of members of the Barrow gang

See Also 
Iowa State Patrol

References

State Bureaus of Investigation
State law enforcement agencies of Iowa